Psilocybe indica is a species of mushroom in the family Hymenogastraceae. The mushroom contains psilocybin, a prodrug for the psychedelic tryptamine psilocin.

It was described from the state of Kerala in India.

See also
List of Psilocybin mushrooms
Psilocybin mushrooms
Psilocybe

References

Entheogens
Psychoactive fungi
indica
Psychedelic tryptamine carriers
Fungi of North America